Helen Gray (born 19 October 1956) is an Australian former swimmer. She competed in the women's 200 metre freestyle at the 1972 Summer Olympics. She was from Townsville in Queensland.

References

External links
 

1956 births
Living people
Olympic swimmers of Australia
Swimmers at the 1972 Summer Olympics
Place of birth missing (living people)
Commonwealth Games medallists in swimming
Commonwealth Games silver medallists for Australia
Swimmers at the 1970 British Commonwealth Games
Australian female freestyle swimmers
20th-century Australian women
Medallists at the 1970 British Commonwealth Games